Carbunup River is a small town in the South West region of Western Australia. At the 2021 census, it had a population of 112. It is situated between Dunsborough
and Margaret River on the banks of the Carbunup River.

The townsite was declared in 1926 as Carbunup but the name was changed in 1958 to Carbunup River to prevent confusion with the town of Carbarup near Mount Barker.

The town is named after the Carbunup River, the word Carbunup is Aboriginal in origin and is thought to mean place of the cormorants or place of a kindly stram or place of the Stinkwood thicket''.

The Discover Deadly reptile education centre is located in Carbunup River, at 10 Wildwood Road.

References

Towns in Western Australia
South West (Western Australia)